Information is an abstract concept that refers to that which has the power to inform.  At the most fundamental level information pertains to the interpretation of that which may be sensed.  Any natural process that is not completely random, and any observable pattern in any medium can be said to convey some amount of information.  Whereas digital signals and other data use discrete signs to convey information, other phenomena and artifacts such as analog signals, poems, pictures, music or other sounds, and currents convey information in a more continuous form.  Information is not knowledge itself, but the meaning that may be derived from a representation through interpretation.

Information is often processed iteratively: Data available at one step are processed into information to be interpreted and processed at the next step.  For example, in written text each symbol or letter conveys information relevant to the word it is part of, each word conveys information relevant to the phrase it is part of, each phrase conveys information relevant to the sentence it is part of, and so on until at the final step information is interpreted and becomes knowledge in a given domain.  In a digital signal, bits may be interpreted into the symbols, letters, numbers, or structures that convey the information available at the next level up.  The key characteristic of information is that it is subject to interpretation and processing.

The concept of information is relevant in various contexts, including those of constraint, communication, control, data, form, education, knowledge, meaning, understanding, mental stimuli, pattern, perception, proposition, representation, and entropy.

The derivation of information from a signal or message may be thought of as the resolution of ambiguity or uncertainty that arises during the interpretation of patterns within the signal or message.

Information may be structured as data. Redundant data can be compressed up to an optimal size, which is the theoretical limit of compression.

The information available through a collection of data may be derived by analysis.  For example, data may be collected from a single customer's order at a restaurant.  The information available from many orders may be analyzed, and then becomes knowledge that is put to use when the business subsequently is able to identify the most popular or least popular dish.

Information can be transmitted in time, via data storage, and space, via communication and telecommunication. Information is expressed either as the content of a message or through direct or indirect observation. That which is perceived can be construed as a message in its own right, and in that sense, all information is always conveyed as the content of a message.

Information can be encoded into various forms for transmission and interpretation (for example, information may be encoded into a sequence of signs, or transmitted via a signal). It can also be encrypted for safe storage and communication.

The uncertainty of an event is measured by its probability of occurrence. Uncertainty is inversely proportional to the probability of occurrence. Information theory takes advantage of this by concluding that more uncertain events require more information to resolve their uncertainty. The bit is a typical unit of information. It is 'that which reduces uncertainty by half'. Other units such as the nat may be used. For example, the information encoded in one "fair" coin flip is log2(2/1) = 1 bit, and in two fair coin flips is log2(4/1) = 2 bits. A 2011 Science article estimated that 97% of technologically stored information was already in digital bits in 2007, and that the year 2002 was the beginning of the digital age for information storage (with digital storage capacity bypassing analog for the first time).

Etymology 

The English word "information" comes from Middle French enformacion/informacion/information 'a criminal investigation' and its etymon, Latin informatiō(n) 'conception, teaching, creation'.

In English, "information" is an uncountable mass noun.

Information theory

Information theory is the scientific study of the quantification, storage, and communication of information. The field was fundamentally established by the works of Harry Nyquist and Ralph Hartley in the 1920s, and Claude Shannon in the 1940s. The field is at the intersection of probability theory, statistics, computer science, statistical mechanics, information engineering, and electrical engineering.

A key measure in information theory is entropy. Entropy quantifies the amount of uncertainty involved in the value of a random variable or the outcome of a random process. For example, identifying the outcome of a fair coin flip (with two equally likely outcomes) provides less information (lower entropy) than specifying the outcome from a roll of a die (with six equally likely outcomes). Some other important measures in information theory are mutual information, channel capacity, error exponents, and relative entropy. Important sub-fields of information theory include source coding, algorithmic complexity theory, algorithmic information theory, and information-theoretic security.

There is another opinion regarding the universal definition of information. It lies in the fact that the concept itself has changed along with the change of various historical epochs, and in order to find such a definition, it is necessary to find common features and patterns of this transformation. For example, researchers in the field of information Petrichenko E. A. and Semenova V. G., based on a retrospective analysis of changes in the concept of information, give the following universal definition: "Information is a form of transmission of human experience (knowledge)." In their opinion, the change in the essence of the concept of information occurs after various breakthrough technologies for the transfer of experience (knowledge), i.e. the appearance of writing, the printing press, the first encyclopedias, the telegraph, the development of cybernetics, the creation of a microprocessor, the Internet, smartphones, etc. Each new form of experience transfer is a synthesis of the previous ones. That is why we see such a variety of definitions of information, because, according to the law of dialectics "negation-negation", all previous ideas about information are contained in a "filmed" form and in its modern representation.

Applications of fundamental topics of information theory include source coding/data compression (e.g. for ZIP files), and channel coding/error detection and correction (e.g. for DSL). Its impact has been crucial to the success of the Voyager missions to deep space, the invention of the compact disc, the feasibility of mobile phones and the development of the Internet. The theory has also found applications in other areas, including statistical inference, cryptography, neurobiology, perception, linguistics, the evolution and function of molecular codes (bioinformatics), thermal physics, quantum computing, black holes, information retrieval, intelligence gathering, plagiarism detection, pattern recognition, anomaly detection and even art creation.

As sensory input 
Often information can be viewed as a type of input to an organism or system. Inputs are of two kinds; some inputs are important to the function of the organism (for example, food) or system (energy) by themselves. In his book Sensory Ecology biophysicist David B. Dusenbery called these causal inputs. Other inputs (information) are important only because they are associated with causal inputs and can be used to predict the occurrence of a causal input at a later time (and perhaps another place). Some information is important because of association with other information but eventually there must be a connection to a causal input.

In practice, information is usually carried by weak stimuli that must be detected by specialized sensory systems and amplified by energy inputs before they can be functional to the organism or system. For example, light is mainly (but not only, e.g. plants can grow in the direction of the lightsource) a causal input to plants but for animals it only provides information. The colored light reflected from a flower is too weak for photosynthesis but the visual system of the bee detects it and the bee's nervous system uses the information to guide the bee to the flower, where the bee often finds nectar or pollen, which are causal inputs, serving a nutritional function.

As representation and complexity 
The cognitive scientist and applied mathematician Ronaldo Vigo argues that information is a concept that requires at least two related entities to make quantitative sense. These are, any dimensionally defined category of objects S, and any of its subsets R. R, in essence, is a representation of S, or, in other words, conveys representational (and hence, conceptual) information about S. Vigo then defines the amount of information that R conveys about S as the rate of change in the complexity of S whenever the objects in R are removed from S. Under "Vigo information", pattern, invariance, complexity, representation, and information—five fundamental constructs of universal science—are unified under a novel mathematical framework. Among other things, the framework aims to overcome the limitations of Shannon-Weaver information when attempting to characterize and measure subjective information.

As a substitute for task wasted time, energy, and material 
Michael Grieves has proposed that the focus on information should be what it does as opposed to defining what it is. Grieves has proposed  that information can be substituted for wasted physical resources, time, energy, and material, for goal oriented tasks. Goal oriented tasks can be divided into two components: the most cost efficient use of physical resources: time, energy and material, and the additional use of physical resources used by the task.This second category is by definition wasted physical resources. Information does not substitute or replace the most cost efficient use of physical resources, but can be used to replace the wasted physical resources. The condition that this occurs under is that the cost of information is less than the cost of the wasted physical resources. Since information is a non-rival good, this can be especially beneficial for repeatable tasks. In manufacturing, the task category of the most cost efficient use of physical resources is called lean manufacturing.

As an influence that leads to transformation 
Information is any type of pattern that influences the formation or transformation of other patterns. In this sense, there is no need for a conscious mind to perceive, much less appreciate, the pattern. Consider, for example, DNA. The sequence of nucleotides is a pattern that influences the formation and development of an organism without any need for a conscious mind. One might argue though that for a human to consciously define a pattern, for example a nucleotide, naturally involves conscious information processing.

Systems theory at times seems to refer to information in this sense, assuming information does not necessarily involve any conscious mind, and patterns circulating (due to feedback) in the system can be called information. In other words, it can be said that information in this sense is something potentially perceived as representation, though not created or presented for that purpose. For example, Gregory Bateson defines "information" as a "difference that makes a difference".

If, however, the premise of "influence" implies that information has been perceived by a conscious mind and also interpreted by it, the specific context associated with this interpretation may cause the transformation of the information into knowledge. Complex definitions of both "information" and "knowledge" make such semantic and logical analysis difficult, but the condition of "transformation" is an important point in the study of information as it relates to knowledge, especially in the business discipline of knowledge management. In this practice, tools and processes are used to assist a knowledge worker in performing research and making decisions, including steps such as:

 Review information to effectively derive value and meaning
 Reference metadata if available
 Establish relevant context, often from many possible contexts
 Derive new knowledge from the information
 Make decisions or recommendations from the resulting knowledge

Stewart (2001) argues that transformation of information into knowledge is critical, lying at the core of value creation and competitive advantage for the modern enterprise.

The Danish Dictionary of Information Terms argues that information only provides an answer to a posed question. Whether the answer provides knowledge depends on the informed person. So a generalized definition of the concept should be: "Information" = An answer to a specific question".

When Marshall McLuhan speaks of media and their effects on human cultures, he refers to the structure of artifacts that in turn shape our behaviors and mindsets. Also, pheromones are often said to be "information" in this sense.

Technologically mediated information 

These sections are using measurements of data rather than information, as information cannot be directly measured.

As of 2007 
It is estimated that the world's technological capacity to store information grew from 2.6 (optimally compressed) exabytes in 1986 – which is the informational equivalent to less than one 730-MB CD-ROM per person (539 MB per person) – to 295 (optimally compressed) exabytes in 2007. This is the informational equivalent of almost 61 CD-ROM per person in 2007.

The world's combined technological capacity to receive information through one-way broadcast networks was the informational equivalent of 174 newspapers per person per day in 2007.

The world's combined effective capacity to exchange information through two-way telecommunication networks was the informational equivalent of 6 newspapers per person per day in 2007.

As of 2007, an estimated 90% of all new information is digital, mostly stored on hard drives.

As of 2020 
The total amount of data created, captured, copied, and consumed globally is forecast to increase rapidly, reaching 64.2 zettabytes in 2020. Over the next five years up to 2025, global data creation is projected to grow to more than 180 zettabytes.

As records 

Records are specialized forms of information. Essentially, records are information produced consciously or as by-products of business activities or transactions and retained because of their value. Primarily, their value is as evidence of the activities of the organization but they may also be retained for their informational value. Sound records management ensures that the integrity of records is preserved for as long as they are required.

The international standard on records management, ISO 15489, defines records as "information created, received, and maintained as evidence and information by an organization or person, in pursuance of legal obligations or in the transaction of business". The International Committee on Archives (ICA) Committee on electronic records defined a record as, "recorded information produced or received in the initiation, conduct or completion of an institutional or individual activity and that comprises content, context and structure sufficient to provide evidence of the activity".

Records may be maintained to retain corporate memory of the organization or to meet legal, fiscal or accountability requirements imposed on the organization. Willis expressed the view that sound management of business records and information delivered "...six key requirements for good corporate governance...transparency; accountability; due process; compliance; meeting statutory and common law requirements; and security of personal and corporate information."

Semiotics 
Michael Buckland has classified "information" in terms of its uses: "information as process", "information as knowledge", and "information as thing".

Beynon-Davies explains the multi-faceted concept of information in terms of signs and signal-sign systems. Signs themselves can be considered in terms of four inter-dependent levels, layers or branches of semiotics: pragmatics, semantics, syntax, and empirics. These four layers serve to connect the social world on the one hand with the physical or technical world on the other.

Pragmatics is concerned with the purpose of communication. Pragmatics links the issue of signs with the context within which signs are used. The focus of pragmatics is on the intentions of living agents underlying communicative behaviour. In other words, pragmatics link language to action.

Semantics is concerned with the meaning of a message conveyed in a communicative act. Semantics considers the content of communication. Semantics is the study of the meaning of signs - the association between signs and behaviour. Semantics can be considered as the study of the link between symbols and their referents or concepts – particularly the way that signs relate to human behavior.

Syntax is concerned with the formalism used to represent a message. Syntax as an area studies the form of communication in terms of the logic and grammar of sign systems. Syntax is devoted to the study of the form rather than the content of signs and sign-systems.

Nielsen (2008) discusses the relationship between semiotics and information in relation to dictionaries. He introduces the concept of lexicographic information costs and refers to the effort a user of a dictionary must make to first find, and then understand data so that they can generate information.

Communication normally exists within the context of some social situation. The social situation sets the context for the intentions conveyed (pragmatics) and the form of communication. In a communicative situation intentions are expressed through messages that comprise collections of inter-related signs taken from a language mutually understood by the agents involved in the communication. Mutual understanding implies that agents involved understand the chosen language in terms of its agreed syntax (syntactics) and semantics. The sender codes the message in the language and sends the message as signals along some communication channel (empirics). The chosen communication channel has inherent properties that determine outcomes such as the speed at which communication can take place, and over what distance.

The application of information study 
The information cycle (addressed as a whole or in its distinct components) is of great concern to information technology, information systems, as well as information science. These fields deal with those processes and techniques pertaining to information capture (through sensors) and generation (through computation, formulation or composition), processing (including encoding, encryption, compression, packaging), transmission (including all telecommunication methods), presentation (including visualization / display methods), storage (such as magnetic or optical, including holographic methods), etc.

Information visualization (shortened as InfoVis) depends on the computation and digital representation of data, and assists users in pattern recognition and anomaly detection.

Information security (shortened as InfoSec) is the ongoing process of exercising due diligence to protect information, and information systems, from unauthorized access, use, disclosure, destruction, modification, disruption or distribution, through algorithms and procedures focused on monitoring and detection, as well as incident response and repair.

Information analysis is the process of inspecting, transforming, and modelling information, by converting raw data into actionable knowledge, in support of the decision-making process.

Information quality (shortened as InfoQ) is the potential of a dataset to achieve a specific (scientific or practical) goal using a given empirical analysis method.

Information communication represents the convergence of informatics, telecommunication and audio-visual media & content.

See also 

 Abstraction
 Accuracy and precision
 Classified information
 Complex adaptive system
 Complex system
 Cybernetics
 Data storage device#Recording media
 Engram
 Exformation
 Free Information Infrastructure
 Freedom of information
 Informatics
 Information and communication technologies
 Information architecture
 Information broker
 Information continuum
 Information ecology
 Information engineering
 Information geometry
 Information inequity
 Information infrastructure
 Information management
 Information metabolism 
 Information overload
 Information quality (InfoQ)
 Information science
 Information sensitivity
 Information superhighway
 Information technology
 Information theory
 Information warfare
 Infosphere
 Internet forum
 Lexicographic information cost
 Library science
 Meme
 Philosophy of information
 Propaganda model
 Quantum information
 Receiver operating characteristic
 Satisficing

References

Further reading
 
 
 
 
 
 
 
 
 Machlup, F. and U. Mansfield, The Study of information : interdisciplinary messages. 1983, New York: Wiley. xxii, 743 p. ISBN 9780471887171

External links

 Semantic Conceptions of Information Review by Luciano Floridi for the Stanford Encyclopedia of Philosophy
 Principia Cybernetica entry on negentropy
 Fisher Information, a New Paradigm for Science: Introduction, Uncertainty principles, Wave equations, Ideas of Escher, Kant, Plato and Wheeler. This essay is continually revised in the light of ongoing research.
 How Much Information? 2003 an attempt to estimate how much new information is created each year (study was produced by faculty and students at the School of Information Management and Systems at the University of California at Berkeley)
  Informationsordbogen.dk The Danish Dictionary of Information Terms / Informationsordbogen

 
Concepts in metaphysics
Information science
Main topic articles
Communication
Abstraction